Myrichthys colubrinus, the banded snake eel, ringed snake eel or harlequin snake eel, is a snake eel from the Indo-Pacific. It occasionally makes its way into the aquarium trade.

The ringed snake eel resembles the venomous sea snake, Laticauda colubrina which is a form of Batesian mimicry. It also adjusts its behaviour to swim freely during the day, whereas other snake eels tend to stay hidden and roam at night.

In 2021, it was first recorded in Hawaii.

References

External links
 Photos of Myrichthys colubrinus in iNaturalist

colubrinus
Fish described in 1781
Taxa named by Pieter Boddaert